is a Japanese actress. She won the award for Best Supporting Actress at the 19th Hochi Film Awards for Izakaya Yūrei.

Filmography

Film
 Something Like It (1981) – Aya
 Burst City (1982)
 Female Prisoner: Cage (1983) – Miwa
 Koisuru Onnatachi (1986)
 Bu Su (1987) – Ponta
 Bakayaro! I'm Plenty Mad (1988) – Nanako Sakisaka
 Izakaya Yūrei (1994) – Shizuko
 Whisper of the Heart (1995) – Asako Tsukishima (voice)
 Tsuribaka Nisshi 8 (1996)
 Nodo Jiman (1999) – Reiko Akagi (Suzuko Fujimoto)
 Villon's Wife (2009) – Miyo
 No Longer Human (2010) – Kotobuki
 The Little House (2014) – Sadako
 A Living Promise (2016) – Yoshiko Nishimura
 Day and Night (2019)
 Angry Rice Wives (2021)
 Jigoku no Hanazono: Office Royale (2021)
 The Sound of Grass (2021)
 7 Secretaries: The Movie (2022) – Satsuki Wanibuchi
 Familia (2023)

Drama
Mujaki na Kankei (1984) – Masae Fujita
Uchi no Ko ni Kagitte... (1984) – Mr. Kosaka's lover
Uchi no Ko ni Kagitte... 2 (1985) – Sakie
Kinpachi-sensei Season 3 (1988) – Machi Tahara
Gift (1997) – Naomi Koshigoe
AIBOU Season 2 (2003–2004) – Ryōko Mitsumine
The Great Horror Family (2004) – Yuko Imawano
14-sai no Haha (2006) – Shizuka Kirino
4 Shimai Tantei Dan (2008) – Miyamoto Kazuyo
Samurai High School (2009) – Kyoko Kamei
Bartender (2011) – Sanae Suwa
Jin (2011) – Otose
Renai Neet: Wasureta Koi no Hajimekata (2012) – Hiromi Amamiya
Doctor-X: Surgeon Michiko Daimon (2012) – Kaneko Terayama
Hanako to Anne (2014) – Fuji Ando
Shizumanu Taiyō (2016)
 7 Secretaries (2020) – Satsuki Wanibuchi

Japanese dub
 Finding Nemo (2003) – Dory
 Finding Dory (2016) – Dory

Awards and nominations

References

External links

JMDb profile (in Japanese)

Japanese voice actresses
Japanese television actresses
Japanese film actresses
1960 births
Living people
Voice actresses from Toyama Prefecture
Musicians from Toyama Prefecture
20th-century Japanese actresses
21st-century Japanese actresses